Leucophyllum zygophyllum, the blue ranger or blue rain sage, is a species of flowering plant in the family Scrophulariaceae, native to northeastern Mexico. A shrub with attractive opposite foliage and a habit of flowering before rainstorms, it is recommended for xeriscaping. It is highly heat and drought tolerant, and is cold hardy to USDA zone 8a. There is a cultivar, 'Cimarron', which is somewhat dwarfed, reaching .

References

zygophyllum
Flora of the Chihuahuan Desert
Endemic flora of Mexico
Flora of Northeastern Mexico
Garden plants of North America
Plants described in 1940